Bid Khvor (also Romanized as Bīd Khvor; also known as Bīd Khor) is a village in Pirakuh Rural District, in the Central District of Jowayin County, Razavi Khorasan Province, Iran. At the 2006 census, its population was 316, in 88 families.

References 

Populated places in Joveyn County